For elections in the European Union, South-West France is a European Parliament constituency. It consists of the region Aquitaine (now part of region Nouvelle-Aquitaine) and Occitanie.

Results

2009

2004

Brackets indicate the number of votes per seat won.

References

External links
 European Election News by European Election Law Association (Eurela)

Former European Parliament constituencies in France
Politics of Aquitaine
History of Occitania (administrative region)